Luigi Giorgi may refer to:

 Luigi Giorgi (soldier), (1913 – 1945), Italian soldier of World War II
 Luigi Giorgi (footballer), (born 1987), Italian football midfielder or defender